Phoenicochroite, also known as melanochroite, is a lead chromate mineral with formula Pb2OCrO4.  It forms striking orange red crystals. It was first discovered in 1839 in Beryozovskoye deposit, Urals, Russia. It is named from the Greek word φοίυικος for "deep red" and χρόα for "color," in allusion to its color.

References

Lead minerals
Chromate minerals
Monoclinic minerals
Minerals in space group 12